Sailing/Yachting is an Olympic sport starting from the Games of the 1st Olympiad (1896 Olympics in Athens, Greece). With the exception of 1904 and the canceled 1916 Summer Olympics, sailing has always been included on the Olympic schedule. The sailing program of 1976 consisted of six sailing classes (disciplines). For each class, seven races were scheduled from 19 July 1976 to 27 July 1976 off the coast of Kingston, Ontario, on Lake Ontario.  The sailing was done on the triangular-type Olympic courses.

Venue 

According to the IOC statutes the contests in all sport disciplines must be held either in, or as close as possible to the city which the IOC has chosen. Since Montréal was not a suitable place the Portsmouth Olympic Harbour Kingston, Ontario, constructed in 1969, was reconstructed in 1974 in time for the 1976 Olympic Sailing event.
A total of three race areas were created on Lake Ontario.

The distance from the Portsmouth Olympic Harbour to course area Bravo (red) was about  From there it was another  to the course area's Alpha (yellow) and Charlie (blue). This however ensured wind conditions without local effects.

Competition

Overview

Continents 
 Asia
 Oceania
 Europe
 Americas

Countries

Classes (equipment)

Medal summary

Medal table

Remarks

Facilities 
At the Portsmouth area a new Olympic facility was constructed. This building was built to contain all facilities needed during that period. It holds, for instance, a large measurement hall and several exercise rooms. Only the size of the overhead doors of the measurement hall was not wide enough to bring a fully assembled Tornado in. Each had to be lifted on one side to enter diagonally.

Sailing 
After the races in the Tempest an unprecedented incident occurred:

Alan Warren and David Hunt set their Tempest on fire. With this boat they won the silver medal in 1972 though during the transport to Canada the boat called "Gift 'orse" was damaged. Warren and Hunt ended in Kingston in 14th position. After the incident Warren stated: "The Horse was lame and we had to put her down."

The story did not end there as Canada Customs could not accept the boat was not available for them to inspect.

Sailors 
During the sailing regattas at the 1972 Summer Olympics among others the following persons were competing in the various classes:
 , The only female competitor Beatriz De Lisocky in the 470. (This generated a lot of discussion in the media.)
 , President International Olympic Committee, Jacques Rogge in the Finn
 , John Bertrand in the Finn
 , Jochen Schümann in the Finn
 , Rodney Pattisson Already two times gold medalist in the Flying Dutchman
 , Valentin Mankin Already two times gold medalist in the Tempest
 , Dennis Conner America's Cup legend in the Tempest
 , Poul Richard Høj Jensen multiple winner of World Championships in the Soling
 , Hubert Raudaschl currently holds the record of competing Olympic Games (9) in the Soling

References

Sources
 
 
 
 

 Official IYRU movie of the 1976 Olympics

 
1976 Summer Olympics events
1976
1976 in sailing
Sailing competitions in Canada